The Castle of Doña Blanca (Spanish: Castillo de Doña Blanca) is a castle located in Puerto de Santa María, Spain. It was declared Bien de Interés Cultural in 1993.

References 

Bien de Interés Cultural landmarks in the Province of Cádiz
Castles in Andalusia